Patrick Graham (born October 3, 1969) is a Canadian former professional boxer. He is not known for his skill, but for his toughness, strength, good basic boxing skills and durability. His boxing idol was George Chuvalo. Although he did not have Chuvalo's durability, Graham showed resilience, and the ability to compete in the sport.

Record

References

1969 births
Living people
Heavyweight boxers
Sportspeople from Calgary
Canadian male boxers